Brenda Schultz defeated Emmanuelle Derly in the final, 7–6(7–5), 6–1 to win the girls' singles tennis title at the 1988 Wimbledon Championships.

Seeds

  Brenda Schultz (champion)
  Radka Zrubáková (first round)
  Julie Halard (quarterfinals)
  Alexia Dechaume (quarterfinals)
  Amy Frazier (semifinals)
  Laura Lapi (first round)
  Emmanuelle Derly (final)
  Jana Pospíšilová (semifinals)
  Cathy Caverzasio (second round)
  Veronika Martinek (first round)
  Sabine Appelmans (second round)
  Jo-Anne Faull (third round)
  Rachel McQuillan (third round)
  Sarah Loosemore (first round)
  Silke Frankl (second round)
  Natalia Medvedeva (quarterfinals)

Draw

Finals

Top half

Section 1

Section 2

Section 3

Section 4

References

External links

Girls' Singles
Wimbledon Championship by year – Girls' singles